Nicholas Leslie "Nicky" Smith (born 28 January 1969) is a former professional footballer. After his professional career ended, he played for several non-League teams whilst serving as a policeman and has captained, coached and managed the England police team, as well as managing AFC Sudbury.

Career
Born in Berkeley, Gloucestershire, Smith started his career at Southend United in the mid-1980s, before moving to Colchester United in 1990. He signed for Northampton Town in 1994, but made only six appearances before dropping into non-League with Sudbury Town in 1995, where he played alongside several other ex-Colchester players in a team that reached the first round of the FA Cup for the first time in the club's history.

After leaving Sudbury, he played for several non-League clubs in East Anglia, including Cambridge City, Braintree Town, Maldon Town and Witham Town, before returning to Sudbury in 2006. In 2007, he became player-assistant manager, and on 17 May 2008 he was appointed manager of AFC Sudbury following the departure of Mark Morsley. He resigned from the position in September 2011. In 2012, he was appointed to the management team of Saffron Walden Town, but resigned later the same year.

Honours

Club
Colchester United
Football Conference winner 1991–92
FA Trophy winner 1991–92

References

External links
 
 Nicky Smith at Colchester United Archive Database

1969 births
Living people
People from Berkeley, Gloucestershire
Sportspeople from Gloucestershire
English footballers
Association football midfielders
Southend United F.C. players
Colchester United F.C. players
Northampton Town F.C. players
Sudbury Town F.C. players
Cambridge City F.C. players
Braintree Town F.C. players
Maldon & Tiptree F.C. players
Witham Town F.C. players
A.F.C. Sudbury players
English Football League players
National League (English football) players
English football managers
A.F.C. Sudbury managers
Saffron Walden Town F.C. managers
British police officers